Upton is an unincorporated community in Summit County, Utah, United States.

References

Unincorporated communities in Summit County, Utah
Unincorporated communities in Utah